The Yamaha TX16W is a rack-mount sampler sound module made by Yamaha.

The TX16W has 12-bit sound with up to 50 kHz mono and 33 kHz stereo sampling. Its filter is digital, allowing 17 different types, with one filter/type per voice. On the rear along with a regular stereo output, there are 8 individual outputs.  Samples are stored on 720kB 3.5" floppy disks. It shipped with 1.5MB of RAM but is expandable up to 6MB. The TX16W uses a Motorola 68000 processor.

The operating system is loaded from disk. There is an alternate OS for the sampler called Typhoon, created by a Swedish organisation.

A free software emulation "Cyclone" was released in 2013 by Sonic Charge (developed by Magnus Lidström, who behind the original Typhoon OS).

Notable users
 Darren Allison of The Divine Comedy (Casanova Album)
 ThouShaltNot
 Jimmy Edgar
 Aphex Twin
 Oval

References

External links
TX16W Homepage
YamahaSynth.com Original OS (archived)
Typhoon 2000 3rd party OS
Vintage Synth
Polynominal TX16W Demo, Review and Manual

Samplers (musical instrument)
Sound modules
TX16W